Gunawan Dwi Cahyo (born 20 April 1989 in Jepara, Indonesia) is an Indonesian professional footballer who plays as a centre-back for Liga 1 club Bali United.

International career 
He made his debut for Indonesia in 2014 FIFA World Cup qualification against Bahrain on 29 February 2012.

Gunawan Dwi Cahyo: International under-23 goals

Honours

Club
Sriwijaya
 Indonesian Community Shield: 2010
 Indonesian Inter Island Cup: 2010
Persija Jakarta
 Liga 1: 2018
 Indonesia President's Cup: 2018
Bali United
 Liga 1: 2019, 2021–22

International
Indonesia U-23
 Southeast Asian Games  Silver medal: 2011
Indonesia
 AFF Championship runner-up: 2016

References

External links 
 

Indonesian footballers
1989 births
Living people
Javanese people
People from Jepara
Indonesia international footballers
Indonesia youth international footballers
Indonesian Premier League players
Liga 1 (Indonesia) players
Persijap Jepara players
PSIS Semarang players
Arema F.C. players
Sriwijaya F.C. players
Persik Kediri players
Mitra Kukar players
Persija Jakarta players
Association football central defenders
Southeast Asian Games silver medalists for Indonesia
Southeast Asian Games medalists in football
Competitors at the 2011 Southeast Asian Games
Bali United F.C. players
Sportspeople from Central Java